Our Lady of Šiluva (Our Lady of the Pine Woods) is Roman Catholic icon of the Virgin Mary in Šiluva, Lithuania. A shrine of the same name has been built and is dedicated to her. The icon is highly venerated in Lithuania and is often called "Lithuania's greatest treasure".

Pope Pius VI granted a Canonical coronation to the venerated image on 8 September 1786. The town of  Šiluva is one of the most important pilgrimage sites in Lithuania with its ancient tradition of the Feast of the Nativity of the Blessed Virgin Mary, popularly called "Šilinės", also celebrated on September 8.

Background

Marian devotion at Šiluva goes back almost to the beginning of Christianity in Lithuania. Grand Duke Jogaila was baptized Catholic in 1387 when he married the queen of neighboring Poland. Later he and his successors worked to spread the Christian faith in their territory, which until then was pagan. They established the ecclesiastical hierarchy, built churches and even personally taught catechism to their subjects.

History
The establishment of a church in Šiluva was the initiative of a nobleman named Petras Gedgaudas who worked in the service of Vytautas the Great. Gedgaudas in 1457 allocated land and other resources for a temple in honor of our Lady. Gedgaudas built a church dedicated to the Nativity of the Blessed Virgin Mary and the Apostles SS. Peter and Bartholomew. Huge crowds of the faithful, even from neighboring Protestant Prussia, would flock to this site to celebrate the indulgenced Feast of the Nativity of the Blessed Virgin Mary.

The icon is painted in the Hodegetria style, and is similar to the famous Madonna Salus Populi Romani. According to legend, the miraculous icon was brought to Šiluva from Rome in 1457 as a gift to Lithuanian nobleman Petras Gedgaudas. The new church gained fame as a Marian shrine.

By 1532 the population in the vicinity of Šiluva became predominantly Calvinist. In the following decades, many Catholic churches were confiscated and closed. Nevertheless, as long as the old church was open, the people continued to attend the annual Feast until finally the church was closed and eventually burned to the ground. In the 16th century, a Lutheran pastor complained about members of his flock traveling to Šiluva to attend the indulgenced Catholic feast of the Nativity of Mary. Around the year 1569 the only remaining parish priest, Father John Holubka, hid all the surviving church valuables and documents in an ironclad box which he buried on the grounds of the devastated church.

The Catholics subsequently attempted legal proceedings against the Calvinists, seeking to regain the confiscated church property. The case was complicated by the fact that the Catholic ownership documents had become lost.

Apparition
This issue was resolved in the summer of 1608 when a few children tending their sheep in a field some distance away from Šiluva reported that they saw  a beautiful woman holding a baby, appeared on the very spot where the church had stood. She was weeping bitterly. The children returned the next day accompanied by many from the whole village and a Calvinist minister, and they saw her, as well. When word spread, an old blind man who had assisted the priest in burying the treasures of the original church recalled the location. After the apparition, the institutional documents of the Catholic church were found, and in 1622 the case concerning the restitution of Catholic ownership was won.

A small wooden church, the Church of the Nativity of the Blessed Virgin Mary, was built on the site of the original church, but proved too small for the many pilgrims who visited. A much larger church was built in 1641.

Pope Pius VI confirmed the authenticity of the apparition of Our Lady of Šiluva by a papal decree promulgated on 17 August 1775.

The present-day Basilica of the Nativity of the Blessed Virgin Mary was consecrated in 1786. The building is one of the finest examples of late Baroque architecture in Lithuania. The interior, designed by Lithuanian artist, Thomas Podgaiskis, has been preserved without significant changes for over two centuries.

Prior to the World War II, processions used to depart from every Lithuanian town, making pilgrimage to Šiluva. The 13th day of each month is known as “Mary’s Day”.

Veneration
On 17 August 1775, Pope Pius VI, promulgated with a Papal Decree the authenticity of Our Lady of Šiluva.

A Chapel of the Apparition was built in the Egyptian-Revival and Gothic styles features the tallest steeple in Lithuania. It was built over the rock where the Blessed Mother stood. The rock itself, which pilgrim make a point to kiss, is under the altar of the chapel.

For its devotion to Mary, Pope Pius XI called Lithuania Terra Mariana (Land of Mary). Pope Pius VI approved devotions to Our Lady of Šiluva and granted indulgences for them.

Pope John Paul II prayed at the shrine in the humble Lithuanian village of Šiluva in 1993, two years after the Baltic nation regained independence. Benedict XVI in 2006 blessed new crowns of gold for a miraculous image of Mary and Jesus at Šiluva. In 2008 he sent a papal legate to take part in festivities at Šiluva to mark the fourth centenary of the Marian apparition.

American-Lithuanian devotions
In the United States, the chapel of Our Lady of Siluva is located within the Basilica of the National Shrine of the Immaculate Conception in Washington, D.C.  The Lithuanian emigre and refugee community in the United States, under the leadership of Bishop Vincent Brizgys, organized in 1963 for establishment of this Šiluva Chapel, which was dedicated in 1966. It displays the artistry of Lithuanian artists in exile at that time, due to Soviet occupation and repression of Lithuania during and following World War II. Vytautus Kasuba based his statue of Our Lady of Siluva with Christ Child on written accounts of witnesses from 1608. Mosaics by Vytautas Jonynas depict the religious and cultural history of Lithuania in two large mosaic panels in the side walls of the chapel, one showing the traditional image of the "Rūpintojėlis" or Christ the Worrier, and the second depicting information about the Lithuanian prince and saint, Casimir. Mosaics and stained glass by Albinas Elskus decorate the golden ceiling with four images of the Madonna from Lithuanian churches, the altar frontispiece showing traditional Lithuanian wayside crosses and the altar back decoration with blue and golden aura about the statue of Our Lady of Siluva. On October 16, 2016, the American-Lithuanian community celebrated the fiftieth anniversary of the dedication of the Chapel. An exhibit regarding the history of the chapel and its representation of Lithuanian cultural and religious traditions was hosted in the Basilica's Memorial Hall from July 1 through October 17.

In addition to the chapel in Washington D.C., there are several other sites within the United States dedicated to Our Lady of Siluva.
There is a statue of Our Lady of Siluva outside the small mission church in Rincon, New Mexico. 
There is a shrine to Our Lady of Siluva in the parish church of SS Peter and Paul in Elizabeth, New Jersey. The shrine, dedicated June 29, 1958, is richly ornamented with Lithuanian artwork and woodcarvings, and holds a painting depicting the apparition and a relic of the original stone on which Our Lady stood.

Because, inspired by the apparition, the community returned to the devout practice of their religion, Our Lady of Šiluva is invoked as the patroness of those who have lapsed from the faith, and of those who pray for them.

Legacy
The Knights of Lithuania have sponsored the establishment of the "Our Lady of Siluva Fund, Inc." during its 2003 National Convention in Brockton, MA, as it celebrated its 90th anniversary.  The purpose of the fund is to help promulgate knowledge of and devotion to Our Lady through her appearance at Siluva, Lithuania, in 1608.

See also
 Marian devotions
 Marian apparitions
 Our Lady of the Gate of Dawn

References

External links
 
 Tamkevicius, Sigitas. "A Pastoral Letter of the Archbishop of Kaunas on the Šiluva Jubilee Year", 3 February 2008
 Shrine of Our Lady of Siluva
 "Chapel of Our Lady of Siluva", Basilica of the National Shrine of the Immaculate Conception

Siluva, Our Lady Of
Siluva
Paintings of the Madonna and Child
Roman Catholic shrines in Lithuania